Robert Orzechowski (born 20 November 1989) is a Polish handball player for MMTS Kwidzyn.

Career

On 1 February 2015, Poland, including Orzechowski, won the bronze medal of the 2015 World Championship. He also participated at the 2016 European Men's Handball Championship.

State awards
 2015  Silver Cross of Merit

References

External links
Profile

1989 births
Living people
Sportspeople from Gdańsk
Polish male handball players
21st-century Polish people